Alexa & Katie is an American sitcom created by Heather Wordham as a Netflix original series. Matthew Carlson serves as showrunner. The series stars Paris Berelc and Isabel May as Alexa and Katie, a high schooler suffering from cancer and her best friend, respectively. Jolie Jenkins, Emery Kelly, Eddie Shin, Finn Carr, Tiffani Thiessen, with Jack Griffo also star. The series debuted on Netflix on March 23, 2018, and ran for three seasons, concluding on June 13, 2020.

Premise
Lifelong best friends Alexa and Katie are eagerly anticipating the start of their freshman year of high school. The two friends confront a crisis when Alexa discovers that she is diagnosed with cancer and starts undergoing treatment for the illness, which leaves them feeling like outsiders at a time when what seems to matter most is fitting in. To support Alexa, Katie makes an important decision and shaves her head with Alexa. The girls try to navigate through all the troubles that high school seems to bring, together, while Alexa is dealing with cancer.

Cast

Main
 Paris Berelc as Alexa, an ambitious basketball player battling cancer. A determined individual, she strives to live a normal life which often gives her rebellious tendencies. She also despises the pity she receives because of her illness.
Isabel May as Katie, Alexa's best friend. Portrayed as quirky and awkward, she consistently supports Alexa's impulsive decisions when dealing with the illness. Katie also shares a liking for theatre. She seems to be attracted to Lucas.
 Jolie Jenkins as Jennifer, Katie's divorced, single mother studying to finish college while working. She is the matriarch of the Cooper family. Because of her home situation, the Cooper family is less financially fortunate than the Mendoza family.
 Emery Kelly as Lucas, Alexa's older brother. Often portrayed as dimwitted and conceited, he cares a great deal for Alexa and aspires to be a doctor, wanting to help others as the doctors helped her. In season two, he becomes the lead of his own band.
 Eddie Shin as Dave, Alexa and Lucas' father, Lori's husband, and an airline pilot. He is the patriarch of the Mendoza family. When Alexa shaves her head, he struggles to cope with the reality, but eventually realizes his faults. He is also shown to have competitive tendencies like his wife, Lori.
 Finn Carr as Jack, Jennifer's son and Katie's younger brother with an avid love for candy and video games. Despite his age, he understands Alexa's situation and helps her the best he can. He eventually adopts a dog, Potato.
 Tiffani Thiessen as Lori, Alexa and Lucas' mother, Dave's wife, and the matriarch of the Mendoza family. Strong-willed, competitive, and at times overprotective, she helps guide Alexa through her fight with cancer and additional problems as a teen.
 Jack Griffo as Dylan (recurring in season 1 & 3; main in season 2), Lucas' highly intelligent best friend. He begins tutoring Alexa in season one when her grades drop. Later, Dylan asks Alexa to the Winter Formal and the two begin dating. In season two, Alexa breaks up with Dylan when he doesn't know what will happen to them when he goes to college, but they eventually agree to be friends.

Recurring

 Kerri Medders as Gwenny, Alexa's self-absorbed and manipulative rival on the girls' basketball team. Much to Alexa's dismay, Gwenny begins acting kinder towards her after learning about Alexa's illness. She also begins dating Lucas in season two, but they break up in season three.
 Iman Benson as Reagan, a friend of Alexa and Katie. She is more sensible than Hannah. Often portrayed as self-centered, Reagan's selfishness is a running gag in the series.
 Merit Leighton as Hannah, a friend of Alexa and Katie. She is more naive and dimwitted than Reagan. In season two, she joins the school's cheerleading team.
 Nathaniel J. Potvin as Ryan, an awkward friend of Katie who worked with her in the school play. Ryan becomes Katie's first kiss, and although the two have feelings for one another, they are not acknowledged directly until the season two finale. He also has a single father.
 Nadja Alaya as Megan, a friend of Alexa who also has cancer. Initially shown in the hospital, it is implied that Megan's sickness has begun to cease due to her attendance at Alexa's sweet sixteen.
 Alyssa Jirrels as Vanessa (season 1), a student who worked in the school play. Because she lost the lead role to Katie, Vanessa is often passive aggressive towards her.
 Ricky Garcia as Cameron (season 2), a dimwitted friend of Lucas and a member of his band. He often follows Lucas around, mirroring his style.
 Scott Wordham as Barry, the manager at Wired, a local coffee shop in Wellard. He is often pessimistic and negative, but allows Katie to work as a barista.
 Jordan Austin Smith as Cody (season 2), a new student whose locker is between Alexa and Katie's. Alexa befriends him, content with the realization that he is unaware of her cancer. He is also the school's mascot.
 Constance Marie as Dr. Corts (season 3), Alexa's therapist. Katie is also treated by her for anxiety.
 Gunner Burkhardt as Spencer (season 3), a boy Alexa meets at the hospital who has cancer. Although Alexa initially has no romantic feelings for him, Alexa later develops feelings for him and they start dating.
 Barrett Carnahan as Aiden (season 3), a stress-free guy that works at Putt Putt Golf and acts as an annoyance for Katie. However, as time goes on, they develop feelings for each other. He later works as a barista at Wired.
 Brady Smith as Joe (season 3), a handyman that starts to date Jennifer.

Guest stars
 Anthony Keyvan as Nathan, a student who worked in the school play. A sensitive individual, his existence has become a running gag as he is often ignored.
 Megan Truong as Britney (season 1), a student on the girls' basketball team. She also worked in the school play.
 Tess Aubert as Mackenzie (season 1), a student on the girls' basketball team. She initially thinks that Britney is the student with cancer.
 Jenica Bergere as Coach Winters, the coach of the girls' basketball team. When Alexa tries out in season two, Winters disappoints her by putting her in junior varsity.
 Katie Walder as Ms. Rogers (season 1), the drama teacher who led the school's play in season one. A running gag is her constant mentioning of her one-sided relationship with her boyfriend.
 Carmella Riley as Nurse Lynda (season 1), a nurse who works at Alexa and Megan's hospital. It is implied that Alexa played pranks on her before being cleared.
 Avery Monsen as Nurse Chad, a nurse who works at Alexa and Megan's hospital. Often nervous, he is shown to be afraid of Alexa's competitive mother, Lori.
 Liam Attridge as Steve (season 2), a dimwitted friend of Lucas and a member of Lucas' band. Along with Cameron, he also follows and mirror's Lucas' style.
 Gregg Daniel as Dr. Breitweiser (season 2), Alexa's doctor who manages her checkups. In season two, he allows her to play basketball due to the improvement in her health.

Production
Alexa & Katie is the first multi-camera sitcom produced by Netflix. The series was ordered in early 2017 with Wordham as executive producer. Berelc and May would star as the protagonists with Carlson serving as showrunner. In June 2017, Thiessen, Shin and Kelly were cast as Alexa's parents and older brother, with Jenkins cast as May's mother. In August 2017, Griffo, Medders and Leighton were cast as Berelc and May's classmates. On April 9, 2018, Netflix renewed the series for a second season, with Wordham replacing Carlson as showrunner.

On February 15, 2019, the series was renewed for a third season of 16 episodes. The season was split into two parts, each featuring eight episodes and focusing on Berelc and May's characters navigating through their final years of high school. The first part of the third season premiered on December 30, 2019. The second part of the third season, which served as the series' conclusion, was released on June 13, 2020.

Episodes

Series overview

Season 1 (2018)

Season 2 (2018)

Season 3 (2019–20)

Accolades 
In 2018, Alexa & Katie was nominated for the Primetime Emmy Award for Outstanding Children's Program. In 2019, the series was recognised at the 12th Television Academy Honors. The show won Favorite Kids TV Show at the 2021 Kids' Choice Awards.

Notes

References

External links
 
 

2010s American high school television series
2010s American teen sitcoms
2018 American television series debuts
2020 American television series endings
2020s American high school television series
2020s American teen sitcoms
English-language Netflix original programming
Television series about cancer
Television shows set in Virginia
Television Academy Honors winners